German submarine U-10 was a Type IIB U-boat built before World War II for service in Nazi Germany's Kriegsmarine. As she was one of the first batch of boats built following the renunciation of the Treaty of Versailles, she was only capable of coastal and short cruising work. This led to her being reassigned to training duties after the Norwegian campaign of 1940 together with many of her sister boats.

After almost five years she was stricken on 1 August 1944 at Danzig (now Gdańsk) and broken up.

Design
German Type IIB submarines were enlarged versions of the original Type IIs. U-10 had a displacement of  when at the surface and  while submerged. She had two shafts and two  propellers.

U-10 was fitted with three  torpedo tubes at the bow, five torpedoes or up to twelve Type A torpedo mines, and a  anti-aircraft gun. The boat had a complement of twentyfive.

Operational history 
U-10 was one of the first batch of submarines to be assigned to an operational unit of the Kriegsmarine, serving with the 1st U-boat Flotilla, at the time known as the Weddigen Flotilla.

Summary of raiding history

References

Bibliography

External links

German Type II submarines
U-boats commissioned in 1935
World War II submarines of Germany
1935 ships
Ships built in Kiel